Lefté Hamidi (born December 1, 1981) is an Iranian footballer. He is one of Arabs of Khuzestan.

References
Persian League
Fars News

1981 births
Living people
Iranian footballers
Foolad FC players
Pas players
Association football forwards
People from Shushtar
Sportspeople from Khuzestan province